Kandsar-e Bibalan (also Romanized as Kandsar-e Bībālān) is a village in Bibalan Rural District, Kelachay District, Rudsar County, Gilan Province, Iran. At the 2006 census, its population was 1,042, in 290 families.

References 

Populated places in Rudsar County